Awaludin or Awaluddin (November 11, 1916 in Padang - February 24, 1980, in Jakarta) was an Indonesian actor, known for his roles from the 1950s-1970s. He was nominated for the Citra Award for Best Supporting Actor at the Indonesian Film Festival for his performance in the 1954 film Lewat Djam Malam.

Filmography

1950s
 Inspektur Rachman - 1950
 Akibat - 1951
 Bunga Rumah Makan - 1951
 Sepandjang Maliboro - 1951
 Rodrigo de Villa - 1952
 Dr. Samsi - 1952
 Leilani - 1953
 Bintang Baru - 1954
 Lewat Djam Malam - 1954
 Pegawai Tinggi - 1954
 Lagak International - 1955
 Tjalon Duta - 1955
 Kekasih Ajah - 1955
 Gadis Sesat - 1955
 Djanjiku - 1956
 Pemetjahan Polgami - 1956
 Karlina Marlina - 1957
 Taman Harapan - 1957
 Sekedjap Mata - 1959

1960s 
 Ibu Mertua - 1960
 Pesta Musik La Bana - 1960
 Santy - 1961
 Djakarta By Pass - 1962
 Tudju Pahlawan - 1963
 Bakti - 1963
 Penjesalan - 1964
 Manusia dan Pristiwa - 1968

1970s 
 Dibalik Pintu Dosa - 1970
 Tuan Tanah Kedawung - 1970
 Benyamin Brengsek - 1973
 Mei Lan, Aku Cinta Padamu - 1974
 Ratapan dan Rintihan - 1974
 Tarsan Kota - 1974
 Tarsan pensiunan - 1976
 Cinta Kasih Mama - 1976
 Suci Sang Primadona - 1977
 Istri Dulu Istri Sekarang - 1978

References

Indonesian male film actors
1916 births
1980 deaths
People from Padang
20th-century Indonesian male actors